Map of the Human Soul is the debut Korean studio album by Korean hip hop group Epik High.

Track listing

References

2003 debut albums
Epik High albums
Woollim Entertainment albums